Gary Frank (born October 9, 1950) is an American actor who won an Emmy Award for his performances on the 1976 TV series Family, which also starred James Broderick, Sada Thompson, Meredith Baxter, and Kristy McNichol.

Career
Frank starred with Glynnis O'Connor in the short-lived 1974 CBS series Sons and Daughters, a drama about young people in a changing society.

Frank appeared in the film Deadly Weapon. He starred in three episodes of Remington Steele as well as episodes of The Streets of San Francisco, T.J. Hooker, Charlie's Angels, Fantasy Island, "The Love Boat",Hunter, Magnum, P.I., Murder She Wrote, L.A. Law, Hill Street Blues, Friday the 13th: The Series, and Star Trek: Deep Space Nine. 

He played bombardier Major Thomas Ferebee in the TV film Enola Gay: The Men, the Mission, the Atomic Bomb, co-starred in the TV Christmas film The Gift opposite Glenn Ford, and appeared on two episodes of Matlock.

Filmography

Film

Television

References

External links
 

1950 births
American male film actors
American male television actors
Living people
Outstanding Performance by a Supporting Actor in a Drama Series Primetime Emmy Award winners
Male actors from Spokane, Washington